Shangani is a small farming settlement in Zimbabwe, near the Shangani River on the road between Gweru and Bulawayo.

References

Populated places in Matabeleland North Province